The 2018 Barcelona GP3 Series round was a motor racing event held on 12 and 13 May 2018 at the Circuit de Barcelona-Catalunya in Montmeló, Catalonia, Spain. It was the opening round of the 2018 GP3 Series, and ran in support of the 2018 Spanish Grand Prix.

Classification

Feature race

Sprint race

Standings after the event 

Drivers' Championship standings

Teams' Championship standings

 Note: Only the top five positions are included for both sets of standings.

See also 
 2018 Spanish Grand Prix
 2018 Barcelona Formula 2 round

References

External links 
Official website

|- style="text-align:center"
|width="35%"|Previous race:
|width="30%"|GP3 Series2018 season
|width="40%"|Next race:

Barcelona
GP3
GP3 Barcelona